KRXF (92.9 FM) is a commercial modern rock music radio station in Bend, Oregon, broadcasting to the Bend, Oregon, area.

The station is referred to as "92/9".

On Sunday July 11, 2010 KRXF moved from 92.7 FM to 92.9 FM.

History
As KXIQ at 94.1, in the 1980s and early 1990s, the station was branded as “Q94” with a Top 40 format.  KXIQ switched to rock for less than two years, before becoming Hot Adult Contemporary “Mix 94” KXIX in 1994.  The format changed again in 1996, to Modern Rock “X94” which later evolved back to rock.  In July 2002, KXIX returned to Top 40 as “Power 94” and has remained one of the most listened-to stations in Central Oregon.

In July 2010, 94.1 KXIX Bend swapped facilities with 92.7 KRXF Sunriver, as “Power 94” became a C2 at 94.1, while “92/7” became a C0 as "92/9".

References

External links
KRXF official website

RXF
RXF
Modern rock radio stations in the United States
Deschutes County, Oregon
Radio stations established in 1974
1974 establishments in Oregon